The Grand Junction Railway (GJR) was an early railway company in the United Kingdom, which existed between 1833 and 1846 when it was amalgamated with other railways to form the London and North Western Railway. The line built by the company was the first trunk railway to be completed in England, and arguably the world's first long-distance railway with steam traction.

The lines which comprised the GJR now form the central section of the West Coast Main Line.

History

The Grand Junction Railway Company was established in the second half of 1832 by the consolidation of two rival companies: the Birmingham and Liverpool Railway Company and the Liverpool and Birmingham Railway Company. The GJR established its chief engineering works at Crewe, relocating there from Edge Hill, in Liverpool.

It began operation with a temporary Birmingham terminus at Vauxhall, The travelling post office where mail was sorted on a moving train was instituted on the Grand Junction Railway in January 1838. Using a converted horse-box, it was carried out at the suggestion of Frederick Karstadt, a General Post Office surveyor. Karstadt's son was one of two mail clerks who did the sorting.

When the London and Birmingham Railway opened on 17 September 1838, services were routed to and from Curzon Street station which it shared with the Grand Junction Railway, the platforms of which were adjacent, providing a link between Liverpool, Manchester and London. The route between Curzon Street railway station and Vauxhall primarily consisted of the Birmingham Viaduct. In October 1838, the Liverpool Mercury reported that It is confidently expected, that after the ensuing winter is over, and the embankments on the London and Birmingham Line are well settled down, first class trains between Liverpool and Manchester and London will not occupy more than nine hours in the journey. This being accomplished, what further improvement could be desired between London and Lancashire?

In 1840, the GJR absorbed the Chester and Crewe Railway soon before it began operation. Considering itself as part of a grand railway network, the company encouraged the development of the North Union Railway which extended the tracks onward to Preston, and it also invested in the Lancaster and Carlisle Railway and the Caledonian Railway. In 1845, the GJR merged with the Liverpool and Manchester Railway, and consolidated its position by buying the North Union Railway in association with the Manchester and Leeds Railway.

In 1841, the company appointed Captain Mark Huish as the secretary of the railway. Huish was ruthless in the development of the business and contributed significantly to the company's success.

Profits
The GJR was very profitable, paying dividends of at least 10% from its beginning and having a final capital value of more than £5.75 million (equivalent to £ million now) when it merged with the London and Birmingham Railway and Manchester and Birmingham Railway companies to become the London and North Western Railway in 1846, which in turn formed part of the London Midland and Scottish Railway in 1923.

Locomotives

One locomotive, Columbine, a 2-2-2 tender engine built in 1845 at Crewe Works, is preserved at the Science Museum. Designed by Alexander Allan, it was the first of the GJR's standard 'Crewe-type' engines, with outside cylinders, and carried fleet number 49. It was withdrawn from service in 1902 by the LNWR, carrying their number 1868.

References

Notes

Sources

Further reading

External links 

 

 
Railway companies established in 1833
Railway companies disestablished in 1846
Railway lines opened in 1837
London and North Western Railway
Rail transport in Birmingham, West Midlands
Rail transport in Wolverhampton
History of Birmingham, West Midlands
Early British railway companies
British companies established in 1833